Yuhua Hamasaki is the stage name of  Yuhua Ou, a Chinese-born American drag queen, singer, actor and reality television personality who came to international attention on the tenth season of RuPaul's Drag Race.

Early life 
Ou was born on March 1, 1990, in Guangzhou. They moved to New York City when they were seven and started doing drag on the club kid scene under the name Yuhua. They later added Hamasaki after Japanese idol Ayumi Hamasaki. Ou holds a business management degree from Pace University.

Career 
Before Drag Race, Hamasaki was one of several drag queens appearing in Katy Perry's performance of "Swish Swish" on Saturday Night Live in May 2017. She also designed outfits for other Drag Race alum prior to her appearance on the series, including Aquaria, Bob the Drag Queen, Peppermint, Aja, Jiggly Caliente, Alexis Michelle and Monét X Change. She has won multiple pageant titles including Miss Fire Island, Miss Fire Island All Stars, Miss Stonewall, and Miss Asia NYC.

Hamasaki was announced as one of fourteen contestants for the tenth season of RuPaul's Drag Race in 2018. Due to the popularity of Monét X Change's sponge dress in episode one, Hamasaki created her own sponge dress for sale, and donated the proceeds to Callen-Lorde. She was eliminated in the third episode after losing a lip sync to "Celebrity Skin" by Hole against Mayhem Miller.

After Drag Race, Hamasaki appeared with Laverne Cox in the music video for "Bruised" by Mila Jam. She appeared in a commercial for VH1's It Gets Better project, supporting LGBTQ youth. She was also in the video for Trinity the Tuck's "I Call Shade" in February 2019.

Hamasaki received notoriety from her self-published series Bootleg Fashion Photo RuView on YouTube based on the WOWPrsents internet series Fashion Photo RuView with Raja and Raven. She reviewed the runway looks of the All-Stars four cast starting on December 4, 2018 with Biblegirl666. She started covering the season eleven looks on February 22, 2019 with Blair St. Clair. Other guests on the series have included Jaymes Mansfield, Cynthia Lee Fontaine, Dusty Ray Bottoms, Jessica Wild, Laganja Estranja, Jiggly Caliente, Vivacious, Alexis Michelle, Phi Phi O'Hara, Trinity the Tuck and Honey Davenport. She filled in for an episode of the actual Fashion Photo RuView on November 24, 2018 with Eureka O'Hara.

Hamasaki was a guest at the 2019 Life Ball, alongside Alaska Thunderfuck.

In June 2019, Hamasaki was one of 37 queens to be featured on the cover of New York Magazine.

She has also been described as a "seamstress, dancer and comedian."

Music 
In 2018, Hamasaki released her first single "The Ankh Song" named after her runway look from episode one resembling an Ankh, noted by the judges. A music video was released on April 5, 2018.

Personal life
Yuhua is non-binary and uses pronouns interchangeably. She resides in New York City.

Filmography

Television

Music videos

Web series

Discography

Singles

See also 
 Chinese people in New York City
 LGBT culture in New York City
 List of LGBT people from New York City

References

External links 

 
 Yuhua Ou at IMDb

1990 births
Living people
Actors from Guangzhou
American actors of Chinese descent
American LGBT people of Asian descent
American musicians of Chinese descent
American non-binary actors
American YouTubers
Asian-American drag queens
Chinese emigrants to the United States
Chinese gay actors
LGBT YouTubers
Chinese non-binary people
Musicians from Guangzhou
Non-binary drag performers
Pace University alumni
People's Republic of China LGBT people
Yuhua Hamasaki